= Vexillum geoffreyanum =

Scientific classification
- Kingdom: Animalia
- Phylum: Mollusca
- Class: Gastropoda
- Subclass: Caenogastropoda
- Order: Neogastropoda
- Superfamily: Turbinelloidea
- Family: Costellariidae
- Genus: Vexillum
- Species: V. geoffreyanum

Binomial name
- Vexillum geoffreyanum (Melvill, 1910)

Species of gastropod

Vexillum geoffreyanum is a species of sea snail, a marine gastropod mollusk, in the family Costellariidae, the ribbed miters.
